Heikin-Ashi is a Japanese trading indicator and financial chart that means "average pace". Heikin-Ashi charts resemble candlestick charts, but have a smoother appearance as they track a range of price movements, rather than tracking every price movement as with candlesticks. Heikin-Ashi was created in the 1700s by Munehisa Homma, who also created the candlestick chart. These charts are used by traders and investors to help determine and predict price movements.

Description 

Like standard candlesticks, a Heikin-Ashi candle has a body and a wick, however, they do not have the same purpose as on a candlestick chart. The last price of a Heikin-Ashi candle is calculated by the average price of the current bar or timeframe (e.g., a daily timeframe would have each bar represent the price movements of that specific day). The formula for the last price of the Heikin-Ashi bar or candle is calculated by: (open + high + low + close)  4. The open of a Heikin-Ashi starts at the midpoint of the previous candle; it is calculated by: (the open of previous bar + the close of the previous bar)  2. The highest and lowest price points are represented by wicks similarly to candlesticks.

To calculate the highest and lowest price of a period:

Heikin-Ashi High=Max value of (High-0, Open-0, and Close​-0) 

Heikin-Ashi Low=Min value (Low-0, Open-0, and Close-0)

(where -0 indicates that values are being taken from the current bar or period). 

The main purpose of a Heikin-Ashi chart is to show the general trend of the price (direction of price) and the strength of each trend; these are represented by the wicks: small lines that extend from the main body of the candle. A series of candles rising with no lower wick signifies a strong uptrend, and vice versa with candles falling with no upper wick. A doji signifies a possible change in the price trend.

Heikin-Ashi is normally paired with other indicators to indicate long (buy) and short (sell) positions.

Limitations of Heikin Ashi charts 
Heikin Ashi charts use average data values and so the actual closing prices of the bars in a set period are not shown, therefore, traders looking for exact closing prices should not rely on the averaged prices shown on these charts. 

As the nature of Heikin Ashi charts is to filter out market noise and reduce the frequency of false signals being shown, some important price gaps (areas where no trading has taken place and so the market has jumped in price) will also be missed from these charts. Candlestick charts will however show price gaps.

References 

Financial charts